Louisville & Nashville 152 is a preserved K-2a class 4-6-2 "Pacific" type steam locomotive listed on the National Register of Historic Places, currently homed at the Kentucky Railway Museum at New Haven, Kentucky in southernmost Nelson County, Kentucky. It is the oldest known remaining 4-6-2 "Pacific" type locomotive to exist. It is also the "Official State Locomotive of Kentucky", designated as such on March 6, 2000. The locomotive is currently owned and being restored back to operating condition by the Kentucky Railway Museum.

History
The L&N No. 152 was built in 1905 at Paterson, New Jersey by the Rogers Locomotive Works, with 6256 as its Rogers Construction Number.  The Louisville and Nashville Railroad purchased No. 152 and four identical Pacifics at the cost of $13,406 apiece.  Pleased with their five Pacifics, the L&N purchased forty more, which the Rogers Locomotive Works (by now owned by the American Locomotive Company) sold to the L&N between 1906 and 1910.

Originally, the L&N No. 152 serviced stations in Alabama, Georgia, Kentucky, and Tennessee.  It pulled Theodore Roosevelt's campaign train between Louisville and Cincinnati in 1912.  When more powerful locomotives were purchased by the L&N in the 1920s, the Pacifics were assigned to the Gulf Coast, a geographically flatter area.  Railroad logs prove that No. 152 was one of the many "Pan American" passenger service.  The No. 152 also pulled the car holding Al Capone on his way to Alcatraz.  As time went on, the No. 152 was used for less and less important routes. On February 17, 1953, the No. 152, the last surviving "K" class Pacific, was retired by the L&N, with its fate uncertain.  During this time it was stored at Mobile, Alabama. L&N President John E. Tilford personally ordered the locomotive to not be cut up for scrap.

The No. 152 was donated to the Kentucky Railway Museum, then located at 1837 East River Road in Louisville, Kentucky; it was one of the museum's first pieces. For thirty years it remained inoperative. After thirteen years of work, in September 1985, it was fired up for the first time in thirty-two years, thanks to funding by the National Park Service and the Brown Foundation.  On April 26, 1986, the locomotive had entered excursion service, pulling seven railcars with a total of 365 passengers. While being refurbished, it stayed at the River Road location when the rest of the museum moved to its new location at Ormsby Station. In October of 1987, 152 was leased to Norfolk Southern for use on excursions for their Steam Program, operating a total of 3 trips. From 1987 to 1988, No. 152 ran several Mainline Excursions over TTI and CSX trackage. In 1990, with the Kentucky Railway Museums move to New Haven, Kentucky, came the end of Mainline excursions for 152. Over the next 21 years, No. 152 pulled tourist trains over the museums former Louisville and Nashville Lebanon Branch from New Haven to Boston, Kentucky along with being featured on the ABC News film Out of New York and the BBC documentary made in Cooperation with The Discovery Channel Take Me to Chicago.

On September 10, 2011, the No. 152 was withdrawn from service for the rest of the 2011 season due to boiler issues. Museum staff expressed skepticism that it will be able to return for future use without major work for which funding was not available at the time. The next overhaul for the engine was started on July 1, 2015. 

When it was originally placed on the National Register, it was located at the Kentucky Railway Museum's original location in Louisville, Kentucky. When the museum relocated to New Haven, No. 152 came with it. No. 152 is one of four rail vehicles at the Kentucky Railway Museum on the National Register. The others are the Frankfort and Cincinnati Model 55 Rail Car, the Louisville and Nashville Combine Car Number 665 and the Mt. Broderick Pullman Car.

References

Rogers locomotives
4-6-2 locomotives
152
Individual locomotives of the United States
Railway locomotives on the National Register of Historic Places
National Register of Historic Places in New Haven, Kentucky
Symbols of Kentucky
Standard gauge locomotives of the United States
Railway locomotives introduced in 1905
Railway vehicles on the National Register of Historic Places in Kentucky
Preserved steam locomotives of Kentucky
Transportation in Nelson County, Kentucky